Pagal  may refer to:

 Pagal (film), a 1940 Indian film
 ”Pagal” (poem), written in Nepali in 1939 by Laxmi Prasad Devkota
 Pagal Adilabadi (1941–2007), an Urdu poet from Hyderabad, India
 Jean-Claude Pagal (born 1964), Cameroonian footballer

See also